A socialist state, socialist republic, or socialist country, sometimes referred to as a workers' state or workers' republic, is a sovereign state constitutionally dedicated to the establishment of socialism. The term communist state is often used synonymously in the West specifically when referring to one-party socialist states governed by Marxist–Leninist communist parties, despite these countries being officially socialist states in the process of building socialism and progressing toward a communist society. These countries never describe themselves as communist nor as having implemented a communist society. Additionally, a number of countries that are multi-party capitalist states make references to socialism in their constitutions, in most cases alluding to the building of a socialist society, naming socialism, claiming to be a socialist state, or including the term people's republic or socialist republic in their country's full name, although this does not necessarily reflect the structure and development paths of these countries' political and economic systems. Currently, these countries include Algeria, Bangladesh, Guyana, India, Nepal, Nicaragua, Sri Lanka and Tanzania.

The idea of a socialist state stems from the broader notion of state socialism, the political perspective that the working class needs to use state power and government policy to establish a socialised economic system. This may either mean a system where the means of production, distribution and exchange are nationalised or under state ownership, or simply a system in which social values or workers' interests have economic priority. However, the concept of a socialist state is mainly advocated by Marxist–Leninists and most socialist states have been established by political parties adhering to Marxism–Leninism or some national variation thereof such as Maoism, Stalinism or Titoism. A state, whether socialist or not, is opposed the most by anarchists, who reject the idea that the state can be used to establish a socialist society due to its hierarchical and arguably coercive nature, considering a socialist state or state socialism as an oxymoron. The concept of a socialist state is also considered unnecessary or counterproductive and rejected by some classical, libertarian and orthodox Marxists, libertarian socialists and other socialist political thinkers who view the modern state as a byproduct of capitalism which would have no function in a socialist system.

A socialist state is to be distinguished from a multi-party liberal democracy governed by a self-described socialist party, where the state is not constitutionally bound to the construction of socialism. In such cases, the political system and machinery of government is not specifically structured to pursue the development of socialism. Socialist states in the Marxist–Leninist sense are sovereign states under the control of a vanguard party which is organizing the country's economic, political and social development toward the realization of socialism. Economically, this involves the development of a state capitalist economy with state-directed capital accumulation with the long-term goal of building up the country's productive forces while simultaneously promoting world communism. Academics, political commentators and other scholars tend to distinguish between authoritarian socialist and democratic socialist states, with the first representing the Soviet Bloc and the latter representing Western Bloc countries which have been democratically governed by socialist parties such as Britain, France, Italy and Western social-democracies in general, among others.

Overview 
The first socialist state was the Russian Socialist Federative Soviet Republic, established in 1917. In 1922, it merged with the Byelorussian Soviet Socialist Republic, the Transcaucasian Soviet Federal Socialist Republic and the Ukrainian Soviet Socialist Republic into a single federal union called the Union of Soviet Socialist Republics (USSR). The Soviet Union proclaimed itself a socialist state and proclaimed its commitment to building a socialist economy in its 1936 constitution and a subsequent 1977 constitution. It was governed by the Communist Party of the Soviet Union as a single-party state ostensibly with a democratic centralism organization, with Marxism–Leninism remaining its official guiding ideology until Dissolution of the Soviet Union on 26 December 1991. The political systems of these Marxist–Leninist socialist states revolve around the central role of the party which holds ultimate authority. Internally, the communist party practices a form of democracy called democratic centralism.

During the 22nd Congress of the Communist Party of the Soviet Union in 1961, Nikita Khrushchev announced the completion of socialist construction and declared the optimistic goal of achieving communism in twenty years. The Eastern Bloc was a political and economic bloc of Soviet-aligned socialist states in Eastern and Central Europe which adhered to Marxism–Leninism, Soviet-style governance and economic planning in the form of the administrative-command system and command economy. China's socio-economic structure has been referred to as "nationalistic state capitalism" and the Eastern Bloc (Eastern Europe and the Third World) as "bureaucratic-authoritarian systems."

The People's Republic of China was founded on 1 October 1949 and proclaims itself to be a socialist state in its 1982 constitution. The Democratic People's Republic of Korea (North Korea) used to adhere to orthodox Marxism–Leninism since its founding until mid-1950s, by which point the supreme leader of North Korea, Kim Il-sung, sought to develop a distinct Korean re-interpretation of the ideology in order to solidify his position within the Workers' Party of Korea (WPK), known as Juche.
Originally regarded as a variant of Marxism–Leninism, Juche was declared to be fully distinct by his son and successor Kim Jong-il, and was adopted as the official state ideology in the 1972 constitution of North Korea. Further developed throughout 1980s and 1990s, Juche made significant ideological breaks with Marxism–Leninism, and in the country's 1992 constitution, all references to Marxism–Leninism, socialism and communism were removed from state and party materials. Scholars are divided over the classification of the modern-day Juche, with some considering it to be a departure from Marxist–Leninist principles, given the primacy of family lineage and nationalism over class struggle, and where social distinction and hierarchy are promoted over classless society and egalitarianism, and others considering it to still be a form of Marxism–Leninism, combined with nationalism and idolization, deification and mystification of the Kim family.

Similarly, direct references to communism in the Lao People's Democratic Republic are not included in its founding documents, although it gives direct power to the governing ruling party, the Marxist–Leninist Lao People's Revolutionary Party. The preamble to the constitution of the Socialist Republic of Vietnam states that Vietnam only entered a transition stage between capitalism and socialism after the country was reunified under the Communist Party of Vietnam in 1976. The 1992 constitution of the Republic of Cuba states that the role of the Communist Party of Cuba is to "guide the common effort toward the goals and construction of socialism (and the progress toward a communist society)". The 2019 constitution retains the aim to work towards the construction of socialism.

Constitutional references to socialism 

A number of countries make reference to socialism in their constitutions that are not single-party states embracing Marxism–Leninism and planned economies. In most cases, these are constitutional references to the building of a socialist society and political principles that have little to no bearing on the structure and guidance of these country's machinery of government and economic system. The preamble to the 1976 Constitution of Portugal states that the Portuguese state has as one of its goals opening "the way to socialist society". Algeria, the Congo, India and Sri Lanka have directly used the term socialist in their official constitution and name. Croatia, Hungary and Poland directly denounce "Communism" in their founding documents in reference to their past regimes.

In these cases, the intended meaning of socialism can vary widely and sometimes the constitutional references to socialism are left over from a previous period in the country's history. In the case of many Middle Eastern states, the term socialism was often used in reference to an Arab socialist/nationalist philosophy adopted by specific regimes such as that of Gamal Abdel Nasser and that of the various Ba'ath parties. Examples of countries directly using the term socialist in their names include the Democratic Socialist Republic of Sri Lanka and the Socialist Republic of Vietnam while a number of countries make references to socialism in their constitutions, but not in their names. These include India and Portugal. In addition, countries such as Belarus, Colombia, France, Russia and Spain use the varied term social state, leaving a more ambiguous meaning. In the constitutions of Croatia, Hungary and Poland, direct condemnation is made to the respective past socialist regimes. The autonomous region of Rojava which operates under the principles of democratic confederalism has been described as a socialist state.

Other uses 

During the post-war consensus, nationalization of large industries was relatively widespread and it was not uncommon for commentators to describe some European countries as democratic socialist states seeking to move their countries toward a socialist economy. In 1956, leading British Labour Party politician and author Anthony Crosland claimed that capitalism had been abolished in Britain, although others such as Welshman Aneurin Bevan, Minister of Health in the first post-war Labour government and the architect of the National Health Service, disputed the claim that Britain was a socialist state. For Crosland and others who supported his views, Britain was a socialist state. According to Bevan, Britain had a socialist National Health Service which stood in opposition to the hedonism of Britain's capitalist society, making the following point:

Although as in the rest of Europe the laws of capitalism still operated fully and private enterprise dominated the economy, some political commentators claimed that during the post-war period, when socialist parties were in power, countries such as Britain and France were democratic socialist states and the same is now applied to the Nordic countries and the Nordic model. In the 1980s, the government of President François Mitterrand aimed to expand dirigisme and attempted to nationalize all French banks, but this attempt faced opposition of the European Economic Community because it demanded a free-market capitalist economy among its members. Nevertheless, public ownership in France and the United Kingdom during the height of nationalization in the 1960s and 1970s never accounted for more than 15–20% of capital formation, further dropping to 8% in the 1980s and below 5% in the 1990s after the rise of neoliberalism.

The socialist policies practiced by parties such as the Singaporean People's Action Party (PAP) during its first few decades in power were of a pragmatic kind as characterized by its rejection of nationalization. Despite this, the PAP still claimed to be a socialist party, pointing out its regulation of the private sector, state intervention in the economy and social policies as evidence of this. The Singaporean prime minister Lee Kuan Yew also stated that he has been influenced by the democratic socialist British Labour Party.

Terminology 

Because most existing socialist states operated along Marxist–Leninist principles of governance, the terms Marxist–Leninist regime and Marxist–Leninist state are used by scholars, particularly when focusing on the political systems of these countries. A people's republic is a type of socialist state with a republican constitution. Although the term initially became associated with populist movements in the 19th century such as the German Völkisch movement and the Narodniks in Russia, it is now associated with Communist Party ruled states. A number of the short-lived communist states which formed during World War I and its aftermath called themselves people's republics. Many of these sprang up in the territory of the former Russian Empire following the October Revolution. Additional people's republics emerged following the Allied victory in World War II, mainly within the Eastern Bloc. In Asia, China became a people's republic following the Chinese Communist Revolution and North Korea also became a people's republic. During the 1960s, Romania and Yugoslavia ceased to use the term people's republic in their official name, replacing it with the term socialist republic as a mark of their ongoing political development. Czechoslovakia also added the term socialist republic into its name during this period. It had become a people's republic in 1948, but the country had not used that term in its official name. Albania used both terms in its official name from 1976 to 1991.

The term socialist state is widely used by Marxist–Leninist parties, theorists and governments to mean a state under the control of a vanguard party that is organizing the economic, social and political affairs of said state toward the construction of socialism. States run by communist parties that adhere to Marxism–Leninism, or some national variation thereof, refer to themselves as socialist states or workers' and peasants' states. They involve the direction of economic development toward the building up of the productive forces to underpin the establishment of a socialist economy and usually include that at least the commanding heights of the economy are nationalized and under state ownership. This may or may not include the existence of a socialist economy, depending on the specific terminology adopted and level of development in specific countries. The Leninist definition of a socialist state is a state representing the interests of the working class which presides over a state capitalist economy structured upon state-directed accumulation of capital with the goal of building up the country's productive forces and promoting worldwide socialist revolution while the realization of a socialist economy is held as the long-term goal.

In the Western world, particularly in mass media, journalism and politics, these states and countries are often called communist states (although they do not use this term to refer to themselves), despite the fact that these countries never claimed to have achieved communism in their countries—rather, they claim to be building and working toward the establishment of socialism and the development towards communism thereafter in their countries. Terms used by communist states include national-democratic, people's democratic, people's republican, socialist-oriented and workers' and peasants''' states.

 Political theories 
 Marxist theory of the state 

Karl Marx and subsequent thinkers in the Marxist tradition conceive of the state as representing the interests of the ruling class, partially out of material necessity for the smooth operation of the modes of production it presides over. Marxists trace the formation of the contemporary form of the sovereign state to the emergence of capitalism as a dominant mode of production, with its organizational precepts and functions designed specifically to manage and regulate the affairs of a capitalist economy. Because this involves governance and laws passed in the interest of the bourgeoisie as a whole and because government officials either come from the bourgeoisie or are dependent upon their interests, Marx characterized the capitalist state as a dictatorship of the bourgeoisie. Extrapolating from this, Marx described a post-revolutionary government on the part of the working class or proletariat as a dictatorship of the proletariat because the economic interests of the proletariat would have to guide state affairs and policy during a transitional state. Alluding further to the establishment of a socialist economy where social ownership displaces private ownership and thus class distinctions on the basis of private property ownership are eliminated, the modern state would have no function and would gradually "wither away" or be transformed into a new form of governance.

Influenced by the pre-Marxist utopian socialist philosopher Henri de Saint-Simon, Friedrich Engels theorized the nature of the state would change during the transition to socialism. Both Saint-Simon and Engels described a transformation of the state from an entity primarily concerned with political rule over people (via coercion and law creation) to a scientific "administration of things" that would be concerned with directing processes of production in a socialist society, essentially ceasing to be a state."Henri de Saint-Simon". Encyclopædia Britannica Online. Retrieved 27 December 2019. Although Marx never referred to a socialist state, he argued that the working class would have to take control of the state apparatus and machinery of government in order to transition out of capitalism and to socialism. The dictatorship of the proletariat would represent this transitional state and would involve working class interests dominating government policy in the same manner that capitalist class interests dominate government policy under capitalism (the dictatorship of the bourgeoisie). Engels argued that as socialism developed, the state would change in form and function. Under socialism, it is not a "government of people, but the administration of things", thereby ceasing to be a state by the traditional definition."Withering Away of the State". In Kurian, George Thomas, ed. (2011). The Encyclopedia of Political Science. Washington, D.C.: CQ Press. With the fall of the Paris Commune, Marx cautiously argued in The Civil War in France that "the working class cannot simply lay hold of the ready-made state machinery, and wield it for its own purposes. The centralized state power, with its ubiquitous organs of standing army, police, bureaucracy, clergy, and judicature—organs wrought after the plan of a systematic and hierarchic division of labor originates from the days of absolute monarchy, serving nascent middle class society as a mighty weapon in its struggle against feudalism". In other words, "the centralized state power inherited by the bourgeoisie from the absolute monarchy necessarily assumes, in the course of the intensifying struggles between capital and labor, 'more and more the character of the national power of capital over labour, of a public organized for social enslavement, of an engine of class despotism'".

One of the most influential modern visions of a transitional state representing proletarian interests was based on the Paris Commune in which the workers and working poor took control of the city of Paris in 1871 in reaction to the Franco-Prussian War. Marx described the Paris Commune as the prototype for a revolutionary government of the future, "the form at last discovered" for the emancipation of the proletariat. Engels noted that "all officials, high or low, were paid only the wages received by other workers. [...] In this way an effective barrier to place-hunting and careerism was set up". Commenting on the nature of the state, Engels continued: "From the outset the Commune was compelled to recognize that the working class, once come to power, could not manage with the old state machine". In order not to be overthrown once having conquered power, Engels argues that the working class "must, on the one hand, do away with all the old repressive machinery previously used against it itself, and, on the other, safeguard itself against its own deputies and officials, by declaring them all, without exception, subject to recall at any moment". Engels argued such a state would be a temporary affair and suggested a new generation brought up in "new and free social conditions" will be able to "throw the entire lumber of the state on the scrap-heap".

 Reform and revolution 
Socialists that embraced reformism, exemplified by Eduard Bernstein, took the view that both socialism and a socialist state will gradually evolve out of political reforms won in the organized socialist political parties and unions. These views are considered a revision of Marxist thought. Bernstein stated: "The socialist movement is everything to me while what people commonly call the goal of Socialism is nothing". Following Marx,  revolutionary socialists instead take the view that the working class grows stronger through its battle for reforms (such as in Marx's time the ten-hours bill). In 1848, Marx and Engels wrote:

According to the orthodox Marxist conception, these battles eventually reach a point where a revolutionary movement arises. A revolutionary movement is required in the view of Marxists to sweep away the capitalist state and the dictatorship of the bourgeoisie which must be abolished and replaced with a dictatorship of the proletariat to begin constructing a socialist society. In this view, only through revolution can a socialist state be established as written in The Communist Manifesto:

Other historic reformist or gradualist movements within socialism, as opposed to revolutionary approaches, include Fabian socialist and Menshevik groupings.

 Leninist theory of the state 

Whereas Marx, Engels and classical Marxist thinkers had little to say about the organization of the state in a socialist society, presuming the modern state to be specific to the capitalist mode of production, Vladimir Lenin pioneered the idea of a revolutionary state based on his theory of the revolutionary vanguard party and organizational principles of democratic centralism. Adapted to the conditions of semi-feudal Russia, Lenin's concept of the dictatorship of the proletariat involved a revolutionary vanguard party acting as representatives of the proletariat and its interests. According to Lenin's April Theses, the goal of the revolution and vanguard party is not the introduction of socialism (it could only be established on a worldwide scale), but to bring production and the state under the control of the soviets of workers' deputies. Following the October Revolution in Russia, the Bolsheviks consolidated their power and sought to control and direct the social and economic affairs of the state and broader Russian society to safeguard against counterrevolutionary insurrection, foreign invasion and to promote socialist consciousness among the Russian population while simultaneously promoting economic development.

These ideas were adopted by Lenin in 1917 just prior to the October Revolution in Russia and published in The State and Revolution. With the failure of the worldwide revolution, or at least European revolution, envisaged by Lenin and Leon Trotsky, the Russian Civil War and finally Lenin's death, war measures that were deemed to be temporary such as forced requisition of food and the lack of democratic control became permanent and a tool to boost Joseph Stalin's power, leading to the emergence of Marxism–Leninism and Stalinism as well as the notion that socialism can be created and exist in a single state with theory of socialism in one country.

Lenin argued that as socialism is replaced by communism, the state would "wither away" as strong centralized control progressively reduces as local communities gain more empowerment. As he put succinctly, "[s]o long as the state exists there is no freedom. When there will be freedom, there will be no state". In this way, Lenin was thereby proposing a classically dynamic view of progressive social structure which during his own short period of governance emerged as a defensive and preliminary bureaucratic centralist stage. He regarded this structural paradox as the necessary preparation for and antithesis of the desired workers' state which he forecast would follow.

 Trotskyist theory of the state 

Following Stalin's consolidation of power in the Soviet Union and static centralization of political power, Trotsky condemned the Soviet government's policies for lacking widespread democratic participation on the part of the population and for suppressing workers' self-management and democratic participation in the management of the economy. Because these authoritarian political measures were inconsistent with the organizational precepts of socialism, Trotsky characterized the Soviet Union as a deformed workers' state that would not be able to effectively transition to socialism. Ostensibly socialist states where democracy is lacking, yet the economy is largely in the hands of the state, are termed by orthodox Trotskyist theories as degenerated or deformed workers' states and not socialist states.

 Criticism 
 Anarchism and Marxism 
Many democratic and libertarian socialists, including anarchists, mutualists and syndicalists, criticize the concept of establishing a socialist state instead of abolishing the bourgeois state apparatus outright. They use the term state socialism to contrast it with their own form of socialism which involves either collective ownership (in the form of worker cooperatives) or common ownership of the means of production without state centralized planning. Those socialists believe there is no need for a state in a socialist system because there would be no class to suppress and no need for an institution based on coercion and therefore regard the state being a remnant of capitalism. They hold that statism is antithetical to true socialism, the goal of which is the eyes of libertarian socialists such as William Morris, who wrote as follows in a Commonweal article: "State Socialism? — I don't agree with it; in fact I think the two words contradict one another, and that it is the business of Socialism to destroy the State and put Free Society in its place".

Classical and orthodox Marxists also view state socialism as an oxymoron, arguing that while an association for managing production and economic affairs would exist in socialism, it would no longer be a state in the Marxist definition which is based on domination by one class. Preceding the Bolshevik-led revolution in Russia, many socialist groups—including reformists, orthodox Marxist currents such as council communism and the Mensheviks as well as anarchists and other libertarian socialists—criticized the idea of using the state to conduct planning and nationalization of the means of production as a way to establish socialism. Lenin himself acknowledged his policies as state capitalism.Lenin, Vladimir (February—July 1918). Lenin Collected Works Vol. 27. Marxists Internet Archive. p. 293. Quoted by Aufheben. .Pena, David S. (21 September 2007). "Tasks of Working-Class Governments under the Socialist-oriented Market Economy". Political Affairs. .

Critical of the economy and government of socialist states, left communists such as the Italian Amadeo Bordiga said that their socialism was a form of political opportunism which preserved rather than destroyed capitalism because of the claim that the exchange of commodities would occur under socialism; the use of popular front organisations by the Communist International; and that a political vanguard organized by organic centralism was more effective than a vanguard organized by democratic centralism. The American Marxist Raya Dunayevskaya also dismissed it as a type of state capitalism because state ownership of the means of production is a form of state capitalism; the dictatorship of the proletariat is a form of democracy and single-party rule is undemocratic; and Marxism–Leninism is neither Marxism nor Leninism, but rather a composite ideology which socialist leaders like Joseph Stalin used to expediently determine what is communism and what is not communism among the Eastern Bloc countries.

 Leninism 
Although most Marxist–Leninists distinguish between communism and socialism, Bordiga, who did consider himself a Leninist and has been described as being "more Leninist than Lenin", did not distinguish between the two in the same way Marxist–Leninists do. Both Lenin and Bordiga did not see socialism as a separate mode of production from communism, but rather just as how communism looks as it emerges out of capitalism before it has "developed on its own foundations".

This is coherent with Marx and Engels, who used the terms communism and socialism interchangeably.Hudis, Peter; Vidal, Matt, Smith, Tony; Rotta, Tomás; Prew, Paul, eds. (September 2018 – June 2019). The Oxford Handbook of Karl Marx. "Marx's Concept of Socialism". Oxford University Press. . . Like Lenin, Bordiga used socialism to mean what Marx called the lower-phase communism. For Bordiga, both stages of socialist or communist society—with stages referring to historical materialism—were characterized by the gradual absence of money, the market and so on, the difference between them being that earlier in the first stage a system of rationing would be used to allocate goods to people while in communism this could be abandoned in favour of full free access. This view distinguished Bordiga from Marxist–Leninists, who tended and still tend to telescope the first two stages and so have money and the other exchange categories surviving into socialism, but Bordiga would have none of this. For him, no society in which money, buying and selling and the rest survived could be regarded as either socialist or communist—these exchange categories would die out before the socialist rather than the communist stage was reached. Stalin made the claim that the Soviet Union had reached the lower stage of communism and argued that the law of value still operated within a socialist economy.

Marx did not use the term socialism to refer to this development and instead called it a communist society that has not yet reached its higher-stage. The term socialism to mean the lower-state of communism was popularized during the Russian Revolution by Lenin. This view is consistent with and helped to inform early concepts of socialism in which the law of value no longer directs economic activity, namely that monetary relations in the form of exchange-value, profit, interest and wage labour would not operate and apply to Marxist socialism. Unlike Stalin, who first claimed to have achieved socialism with the Soviet Constitution of 1936 and then confirmed it in the Economic Problems of Socialism in the USSR'', Lenin did not call the Soviet Union a socialist state, nor did he claim that it had achieved socialism. He adopted state capitalist policies, defending them from left-wing criticism, but arguing that they were necessary for the future development of socialism and not socialist in themselves. On seeing the Soviet Union's growing coercive power, Lenin was quoted as saying that Russia had reverted to "a bourgeois tsarist machine [...] barely varnished with socialism".

Libertarian socialism 
A variety of non-state, libertarian communist and socialist positions reject the concept of a socialist state altogether, believing that the modern state is a byproduct of capitalism and cannot be used for the establishment of a socialist system. They reason that a socialist state is antithetical to socialism and that socialism will emerge spontaneously from the grassroots level in an evolutionary manner, developing its own unique political and economic institutions for a highly organized stateless society. Libertarian communists, including anarchists, councillists, leftists and Marxists, also reject the concept of a socialist state for being antithetical to socialism, but they believe that socialism can only be established through revolution and dissolving the existence of the state. Within the socialist movement, there is criticism towards the use of the term socialist states in relation to countries such as China and previously of Soviet Union and Eastern and Central European states before what some term the "collapse of Stalinism" in 1989.

Anti-authoritarian communists and socialists such as anarchists, other democratic and libertarian socialists as well as revolutionary syndicalists and left communists claim that the so-called socialist states actually presided over state capitalist economies and cannot be called socialist. Those socialists who oppose any system of state control whatsoever believe in a more decentralized approach which puts the means of production directly into the hands of the workers rather than indirectly through state bureaucracies which they claim represent a new elite or class. This leads them to consider state socialism a form of state capitalism (an economy based on centralized management, capital accumulation and wage labor, but with the state owning the means of production) which Engels stated would be the final form of capitalism rather than socialism.

Trotskyism 
Some Trotskyists following on from Tony Cliff deny that it is socialism, calling it state capitalism. Other Trotskyists agree that these states could not be described as socialist, but deny that they were state capitalist. They support Leon Trotsky's analysis of pre-restoration Soviet Union as a workers' state that had degenerated into a bureaucratic dictatorship which rested on a largely nationalized industry run according to a production plan and claimed that the former Stalinist states of Central and Eastern Europe were deformed workers' states based on the same relations of production as the Soviet Union. Some Trotskyists such as the Committee for a Workers' International have at times included African, Asian and Middle Eastern socialist states when they have had a nationalized economy as deformed workers' states. Other socialists argued that the neo-Ba'athists promoted capitalists from within the party and outside their countries.

List of socialist states

See also 

 Anarcho-syndicalism
 Legislatures in communist states
 Soviet democracy
 Soviet (council)

 Soviet Republic (disambiguation)
 Soviet republic (system of government)
Wa State
 Workers' council

References 

Republicanism
Socialism